Eduard Buchner (20 May 1860 – 13 August 1917) was a German chemist and zymologist, awarded the 1907 Nobel Prize in Chemistry for his work on fermentation.

Biography

Early years
Buchner was born in Munich to a physician and Doctor Extraordinary of Forensic Medicine. His older brother was Hans Ernst August Buchner. In 1884, he began studies of chemistry with Adolf von Baeyer and of botany with Carl Nägeli, at the Botanic Institute in Munich. After a period working with Otto Fischer (cousin of Emil Fischer) at the University of Erlangen, Buchner was awarded a doctorate from the University of Munich in 1888 under Theodor Curtius.

Academics
Buchner was appointed assistant lecturer in the organic laboratory of Adolf von Baeyer in 1889 at the University of Munich. In 1891, he was promoted to lecturer at the same university.

In the autumn of 1893, Buchner moved to University of Kiel and appointed professor in 1895. In the next year he was appointed Professor Extraordinary for Analytical and Pharmaceutical Chemistry in the chemical laboratory of H. von Pechmann at the University of Tübingen.

In October, 1898, he was appointed to the Chair of General Chemistry in the Agricultural University of Berlin, fully training his assistants by himself, and received his rehabilitation in 1900.

In 1909, he was transferred to the University of Breslau (reorganised to be University of Wrocław in 1945), and in 1911, he moved to University of Würzburg.

The Nobel Prize 
Buchner received the Nobel Prize in Chemistry in 1907. The experiment for which Buchner won the Nobel Prize consisted of producing a cell-free extract of yeast cells and showing that this "press juice" could ferment sugar. This dealt yet another blow to vitalism by showing that the presence of living yeast cells was not needed for fermentation. The cell-free extract was produced by combining dry yeast cells, quartz and kieselguhr and then pulverizing the yeast cells with a pestle and mortar. This mixture would then become moist as the yeast cells' contents would come out of the cells. Once this step was done, the moist mixture would be put through a press and the resulting "press juice" had glucose, fructose, or maltose added and carbon dioxide was seen to evolve, sometimes for days. Microscopic investigation revealed no living yeast cells in the extract. Buchner hypothesized that yeast cells secrete proteins into their environment in order to ferment sugars, but it was later found that fermentation occurs inside the yeast cells. Maria Manasseina claimed to have discovered free-cell fermentation a generation earlier than Buchner, but Buchner and Rapp considered that she was subjectively convinced of the existence of an enzyme of fermentation, and that her experimental evidence was unconvincing.

Personal life

Buchner married Lotte Stahl in 1900. At the outbreak of the First World War he volunteered and rose to the rank of Major commanding a munition-transport unit on the western and then eastern front. In March 1916 he returned the University of Wurzburg. In April 1917 he volunteered again. On 11 August 1917, while stationed at Focșani, Romania,  he was hit by a shell fragment and died two days later. He died in the Battle of Mărășești and is buried in the cemetery of German soldiers from Focșani, Romania.

Though it is believed by some that the Büchner flask and the Büchner funnel are named for him, they are actually named for the industrial chemist Ernst Büchner.

Publications

See also
History of biochemistry

References

External links
 
  including the Nobel Lecture, December 11, 1907 Cell-Free Fermentation
  (English translation of Buchner's "Alkoholische Gährung ohne Hefezellen")

1860 births
1917 deaths
Scientists from Munich
German biochemists
Nobel laureates in Chemistry
German Nobel laureates
University of Erlangen-Nuremberg alumni
Ludwig Maximilian University of Munich alumni
Academic staff of the University of Kiel
Academic staff of the University of Breslau
Academic staff of the University of Tübingen
Academic staff of the University of Würzburg
German military personnel killed in World War I
German military doctors
People from the Kingdom of Bavaria
Military personnel of Bavaria
German Army personnel of World War I